Worondi Rivulet, a perennial stream of the Hunter River catchment, is located in the Upper Hunter region of New South Wales, Australia.

Course and features
Worondi Rivulet rises on the slopes of the Great Dividing Range, east of Terragong and northeast of Merriwa. The river flows generally south by west and then southeast, joined by one minor tributary before reaching its confluence with the Goulburn River, west of Sandy Hollow within Goulburn River National Park. The river descends  over its  course.

See also

 Rivers of New South Wales

References

External links
 

Rivers of New South Wales
Hunter Region
Rivers of the Hunter Region
Upper Hunter Shire